Wellington Bay is an Arctic waterway in Kitikmeot Region, Nunavut, Canada. It is located in Dease Strait, off southern Victoria Island. It is northwest of the community of Cambridge Bay.

It is one of several Canadian landforms named in honour of Arthur Wellesley, 1st Duke of Wellington.

Geography
There are several small islands within the bay. Several rivers flow into it including the Ekalluk River, Halovik River, Paalliq, and Paliryuak River.

Fauna
Commercial fishing activities include Arctic char.

References

Bays of Kitikmeot Region
Victoria Island (Canada)